Mystroceridius is a genus of ground beetles in the family Carabidae. There are at least two described species in Mystroceridius, found in the Galapagos.

Species
These two species belong to the genus Mystroceridius:
 Mystroceridius basilewskyi Reichardt, 1972
 Mystroceridius wittmeri Franz, 1978

References

Trechinae